West Anhui University (Chinese: 皖西学院; pinyin: Wǎnxī Xuéyuàn; abbr: WAU) is a university in Lu'an City, Anhui Province, China. It obtained the authority of granting the bachelor's degree in 2004 and was approved in 2014 for the construction unit of "local applied high-level university" in Anhui Province.

History 
Lu'an Normal School: founded in 1951, formerly known as the Anhui Third Class of Agricultural School which was constructed by the former vice chairman of the National People's Congress and former chairman of the Central Committee of the Democratic Revolution Mr. Zhu Yunshan. In 1999 the school was included in the Lu'an Normal College.

Lu'an Normal College: founded in August 1958, the college site was located in the west bank of the Weihe River Taohua Dock in Lu'an. In September 1963, the college changed its name as Lu'an Middle School Teacher Further Education School, and changed again as the Lu'an area teacher training course, later the West Anhui Normal University between 1970 and 1975. After restoring the National College Entrance Examination in 1977, the name of it was changed as Anhui Normal University Lu'an Teaching Point. In January 1979, it was restored as Lu'an Normal College after approval by the State Council.

West Anhui Union University: founded in autumn 1985. It had three majors: accounting statistics, industrial civil buildings and freshwater aquaculture.

West Anhui University: in March 2000, the Ministry of Education merged these three schools and set up the West Anhui University.

Administration

Colleges 

 College of Materials and Chemical Engineering
 College of Electrical and Optoelectronic Engineering
 College of Electronic and Information Engineering
 College of Law
 College of Environment and Tourism
 College of Mechanical and Vehicle Engineering
 College of Architecture and Civil Engineering
 College of Finance and Mathematics

 College of Economics and Management
 College of Biological and Pharmaceutical Engineering
 College of Physical Education
 College of Foreign Language
 College of Culture and Media
 College of Art
 College of Marxism

Disciplines 
The university has more than 60 disciplines, with 2 national special disciplines, 1 national "discipline comprehensive reform" pilot discipline and 1 provincial key discipline.

References 

Universities and colleges in China
Educational institutions established in 1918
1918 establishments in China